is a Japanese footballer currently playing as a defender for Fagiano Okayama, on loan from Tokushima Vortis.

Career statistics

Club
.

Notes

References

External links

1997 births
Living people
Association football people from Osaka Prefecture
Chuo University alumni
Japanese footballers
Association football defenders
J2 League players
J1 League players
Tokushima Vortis players
Fagiano Okayama players